Courier chess is a chess variant that dates from the 12th century and was popular for at least 600 years. It was a part of the slow evolution towards modern chess from Medieval Chess.

Medieval rules
Courier chess is played on an 8x12 board (i.e., 8 ranks by 12 files). Literary and artistic evidence indicate that the board was always checkered but that there was no consistency as to which squares were light and which squares were dark. The more frequent pattern is that the square at the bottom right corner was light, just as in modern chess.

The winning objective is the same as western chess: to checkmate the opponent's king. The stalemate rule is unknown; the subject was unsettled in Germany late into the nineteenth century.
 

 
 The kings start on squares of their own color, at f1 and f8. Just as in western chess, the king may move to any adjoining square, and a player cannot end their turn in check. There is no castling.
 Next to the king, on e1 and e8, stands the sage or mann, which moves one square in any direction, like the king, but can be hazarded or captured like a normal piece.
 On the other central file, at g1 and g8, stands the ferz, or queen, which moves one square diagonally.
 On the queen's other side, at h1 and h8, stands a piece known as the schleich (or fool, thief, jester, smuggler, spy, or trull) moving one square orthogonally: the move of the wazir.
 At d1, i1, d8, and i8 stands the piece that gave the game its name: the läufer, or courier, or runner. It moves like the modern chess bishop, any number of squares diagonally.
 Next, at c1, j1, c8, and j8, stands the bishop, or archer. It moves as the alfil, two squares diagonally, leaping the first square.
 At b1, k1, b8, and k8 stands the knight, which moves just like the modern chess knight: One square orthogonally, followed by one square diagonally, leaping the squares. 
In the corners, at a1, l1, a8, and l8 stands the rook, which moves the same as its modern chess counterpart: any number of squares orthogonally.
 The second rank for each player is filled with pawns, which, like modern chess pawns, move one square forward and capture one square diagonally forward. Unlike in modern chess, pawns cannot double advance on their first move, therefore the en passant rule does not apply. The pawn promotion rule is that a pawn reaching the furthest rank is promoted to a queen (ferz).

The old rule for first moves is that at the start of the game each player must move their rook pawns, their queen pawn, and their queen two squares forward (see top diagram). Such a two-square leap along a file was called a joyleap, and was not available after the starting moves.

Modern rules
Albers attempted to popularize the game in Germany in 1821 with updated rules. The starting setup is the same as for medieval courier chess. The king, queen, courier (bishop), knight, and rook have their modern powers. The bishop (or archer) can move one square diagonally, or leap diagonally to the second square. The fool, standing beside the queen, moves one square in any direction. The sage, standing beside the king, combines the powers of the fool and the knight. The pawn moves like the modern pawn, except that after reaching the farthest rank it must remain there for two moves before taking up its new career as a piece. Castling is permitted, if all squares between the king and the rook are vacant, the king has not been checked, the rook is not en prise, neither has moved, and no square between them is under attack. The king moves to the bishop's square, and the rook leaps over him to the courier's square, in either wing. The rule on stalemate has not been preserved; the subject was unsettled in Germany well into the nineteenth century.

Subsequent attempts to modernize courier chess include Modern Courier Chess (Paul Byway, starting 1971). An attempt has recently been made to make this game fully compatible with FIDE modern conventions: Reformed Courier-Spiel (Clément Begnis, 2011).

History
Wirnt von Gravenberg, writing early in the thirteenth century, mentioned the Courier Game in his poem Wigalois, and expected his readers to know what he was talking about. Heinrich von Beringen, about a hundred years later, mentioned the introduction of the couriers as an improvement in chess. Kunrat von Ammenhausen, still in the first half of the fourteenth century, told how he had once in Constance seen a game with sixteen more men than in the "right chess": each side having a trull, two couriers, a counsellor, and four extra pawns. He added that he had never seen the game anywhere else, in Provence, France, or Kurwalhen.

Sometime shortly after 1475, someone put the courier on the standard chessboard in place of the old alfil and gave the queen the combined powers of the courier and the rook. This game was so much more exciting than medieval chess that it soon drove the older game off the market. Other improvements were tried out. One was an optional double first step for the pawns. This was at first restricted to the king's, queen's, and rooks' pawns, and then gradually extended to the others.

In the early sixteenth century Lucas van Leyden, in the Netherlands, painted a picture called The Chess Players in which a woman appears to be beating a man at courier chess. Gustavus Selenus (Augustus, Duke of Brunswick-Lüneburg) in his 1616 book Das Schach- oder Königs-Spiel, mentioned the Courier Game as one of three forms of chess played in the village of Ströbeck near Halberstadt in Sachsen-Anhalt, Germany. He described it in detail, and gave drawings of the pieces. The names he gave the pieces do not always match the figures in the drawings: the piece called the Schleich is depicted as a court jester. In 1651 Frederick William, Elector of Brandenburg and Duke of Prussia, gave to Ströbeck a playing board with chess on one side and the Courier Game on the other, and a set of silver pieces. These pieces were lent in the eighteenth century and never returned, but there is a set of wooden pieces. In 1821 H. G. Albers reported that courier chess was still played in Ströbeck, and that some pieces had gained more powerful moves, but a few years later other visitors found that it had been abandoned. In 1883, the local chess club revived it. Playing sets based on Lucas van Leyden's painting are commercially available.

See also 
 Chess variants

Notes

References

Bibliography

Eales, Richard. Chess: The History of a Game. Hardinge Simpole Publishing, Glasgow, 2002. Previously published by B. T. Batsford Limited, 1985.
 Knowlton, Rick. "Courier Chess" article in The Chess Collector, Vol. 28, N. 1, 2009, pp. 13–17, online at Courier Chess
 Murray, H. J. R. A History of Chess. Oxford University Press, Oxford, 1913 et seqq.
 Verney, Maj. George Hope. Chess Eccentricities. London, Longmans, Green & Co., 1885, photographically reproduced online at

External links
 Courier chess by Hans Bodlaender, The Chess Variant Pages
 Courier Spiel (the 19th-century version) by Hans Bodlaender, The Chess Variant Pages
 Ströbeck town web page 
 Ströbeck chess club 
 Chess Museum in Ströbeck (links to a German version)
 Courier Chess a simple program by Ed Friedlander (Java)

Games related to chaturanga
Abstract strategy games
History of chess
Medieval chess